Jennifer ‘Jennie’ Simpson is a camogie player, winner of  Soaring Star awards in 2010 and 2011 and an All Ireland junior medal in 2011.

Other awards
National Camogie League Division 2 medal 2011, Munster Inter-provisional title, County Championship 2009, Ashbourne Cup 2008.

References

External links
 Camogie.ie Official Camogie Association Website

1987 births
Living people
Waterford camogie players
Waterford IT camogie players